John Bowman (born July 19, 1982) is the defensive line coach for the BC Lions of the Canadian Football League (CFL). He is also a former professional Canadian football defensive end who played for 14 seasons with the Montreal Alouettes. He is a two-time Grey Cup champion after winning in 2009 and 2010 and was named a CFL All-Star twice and a Divisional All-Star nine times. Bowman is the Alouettes' all-time leader in sacks with 134 in his career.

College career
Bowman played college football for Wingate. John Bowman was a Don Hansen's Football Gazette All-American following the 2003 season. An All-SAC selection the same year, Bowman was fourth in the NCAA Division II in quarterback sacks (1.2/game) as a senior. His football coaches at Wingate were current head coach Joe Reich and Reich's predecessor, Bob Brush. Bowman is a member of the Wingate Sports Hall of Fame and the South Atlantic Conference Hall of Fame.

Professional career

Indoor football
In 2005, Bowman signed with the Daytona Beach Hawgs of the National Indoor Football League. After the Hawgs became suspended from the postseason, Bowman signed with the Sioux City Bandits of United Indoor Football. Following the 2005 season Bowman signed with the NIFL's Rome Renegades.

Montreal Alouettes
In 2006, Bowman signed with the Montreal Alouettes of the Canadian Football League (CFL). By his second season in the league, Bowman had established himself as one of the CFL's best pass rushers. From 2009-2011, Bowman had 3 continuous seasons producing double digit sacks, recording 12 each year. From 2013-2016, Bowman had another double digit streak, with 11, 12, 19, and 10 sacks by year. Entering his 8th season as an Alouette, at the age of 30, Montreal extended his contract for three more seasons. Bowman suffered a partially torn bicep in Week 8 of the 2018 season. He returned and produced a 5 sack effort in his final season, giving Bowman a career total of 126. During 214 career games, Bowman also accumulated 406 tackles, 31 forced fumbles, and one touchdown, which Bowman scored in what was announced as his final home game in the CFL. However, Bowman re-signed with Montreal in February 2019. He produced another quality season, with 8 sacks, 45 tackles, another forced fumble, and his first career interception. Bowman was named a division All-Star yet again, and helped Montreal return to the playoffs for the first time in 4 seasons. On February 5, 2021, following a cancelled 2020 season the Alouettes announced that they would not be re-signing Bowman for the 2021 season. He was released on February 16, 2021.

During his 14 seasons, Bowman was named a CFL-East All-Star on nine occasions, and a CFL All-Star twice, in addition to winning a pair of Grey Cup games under head coach Marc Trestman. He is the Alouettes franchise leader with 134-career sacks, and sits sixth all-time in the CFL.

Bowman was announced as a member of the Canadian Football Hall of Fame 2023 class on March 16, 2023, in his first year of eligibility.

Coaching career
On January 17, 2022, it was announced that Bowman had joined the BC Lions to serve as the team's defensive line coach.

References

External links
Montreal Alouettes bio

1982 births
Living people
American football defensive ends
Players of Canadian football from New York (state)
BC Lions coaches
Canadian football defensive linemen
Montreal Alouettes players
Sioux City Bandits players
Sportspeople from Brooklyn
Wingate Bulldogs football players
Players of American football from New York City